The Clearwater Subdivision is a railroad line owned by CSX Transportation in the Tampa Bay region of Florida. The line begins just east of downtown Tampa in Gary and heads north through some of Tampa's suburban neighborhoods. In Sulphur Springs, the Clearwater Subdivision turns and runs west through Oldsmar, where it crosses Tampa Bay. It briefly shifts south running through Safety Harbor, and then heads west again to Clearwater. In Clearwater, it turns southeast, running through Largo and Pinellas Park before terminating at Fifth Avenue North in St. Petersburg near Tropicana Field. At the line's north end it continues from the Tampa Terminal Subdivision and at its south end the track comes to an end.

History

From Tampa north to Sulphur Springs, the Clearwater Subdivision runs along the former Tampa Northern Railroad, which was built in 1908. From Sulphur Springs west to Clearwater, it runs along the former Tampa and Gulf Coast Railroad, which was built in 1914. Both the Tampa Northern Railroad and the Tampa and Gulf Coast Railroad were absorbed by the Seaboard Air Line Railroad (SAL) in 1913 and 1915 respectively. From Clearwater to St. Petersburg, the line runs along the southern end of the historic Orange Belt Railway, which was built in 1888. It later became part of the Plant System, which soon after became part of the Atlantic Coast Line Railroad (ACL). 

Both the Atlantic Coast Line and the Seaboard Air Line networks merged on July 1, 1967, to form the Seaboard Coast Line Railroad. Following the merger, the SAL track was abandoned south of Clearwater, replaced by a new crossover built in North Clearwater at milepost SY873.0 to permit use of the former ACL line south to St. Petersburg. On November 1, 1980, the Seaboard Coast Line became part of CSX. 

From the 1910s to the 1960s, both the ACL and SAL operated long-distance passenger trains over portions of what is now the CSX Subdivision. SAL trains used what are now CSX Subdivision tracks between Gary and Clearwater, with stations in Oldsmar and Safety Harbor. ACL trains ran on the now-CSX Clearwater Sub's tracks between Clearwater and St. Petersburg. When Amtrak took over rail passenger service on May 1, 1971, it operated the Silver Meteor and Silver Star deluxe passenger trains over the Subdivision, providing Clearwater and St. Petersburg with daily overnight service to New York and intermediate points. 

Regularly-scheduled passenger rail service on the line ended on February 1, 1984, when Amtrak discontinued its rail services in Pinellas County, choosing to terminate its trains at Tampa Union Station. Substitute Amtrak Thruway Motorcoach service has been provided since then between Tampa Union Station and Pinellas Park. The old SAL passenger stations in Safety Harbor and Oldsmar were demolished in 1965 and 1967, respectively.

Recent history

In March 2008, the Clearwater Subdivision's trackage in downtown St. Petersburg was pulled up, along with the South Side Spur, which ran south of Central Avenue and east of 34th Street South (part of the former Seaboard line). That right-of-way, as well as the right-of-way of several other former CSX railroad lines in the county beginning in the 1990s, was converted into a section of the Pinellas Trail. Today, the line ends at 5th Avenue North in St. Petersburg. Though, some severed track segments remain between I-375 and Tropicana Field.

In 2015, CSX proposed to sell both the Clearwater and Brooksville Subdivisions to the Florida Department of Transportation for potential use as commuter rail. FDOT is currently studying this possibility. Similar transactions between FDOT and CSX have taken place in the Miami and Orlando areas for tracks that today run the Tri-Rail and SunRail commuter lines respectively.

Gallery

See also

List of CSX Transportation lines
St. Petersburg station (Amtrak)
Clearwater station (Amtrak)

References

Bibliography

CSX Transportation lines
Florida railroads
Transportation in Hillsborough County, Florida
Transportation in Pinellas County, Florida